LaPorte Community School Corporation (LPCSC) is a school district headquartered in LaPorte, Indiana.

Schools
Middle and High Schools:
 LaPorte High School
LaPorte Middle School
Intermediate School:
Kesling Intermediate School
Elementary Schools:
 Crichfield Elementary
 Hailmann Elementary
 Handley Elementary
 Indian Trail Elementary
 Kingsbury Elementary
 Kingsford Heights Elementary
 Lincoln Elementary
 Riley Elementary

References

External links
 LaPorte Community School Corporation

School districts in Indiana
LaPorte County, Indiana